Ward Parkway is a boulevard in Kansas City, Missouri, United States, near the Kansas-Missouri state line. Ward Parkway begins at Brookside Boulevard on the eastern edge of the Country Club Plaza and continues westward along Brush Creek as U.S. Route 56 until it turns southward across the creek just before the Kansas-Missouri state line. It then continues south for four miles, terminating at Wornall Road near West 95th Street.

Ward Parkway has a wide, landscaped median, which is decorated with fountains and statuary. Many of Kansas City's finest large houses are along Ward Parkway in the Country Club District.

The street name derives from the family of pioneer Seth E. Ward who owned property on both sides of the parkway and whose house at 1032 West 55th St. is on the National Register of Historic Places.

Location

Northern terminus: Brookside Blvd./Volker Blvd. 
Southern terminus: Wornall Road

History
Ward Parkway was created as part of developer J.C. Nichols's overall plans for the Country Club District. Desiring a boulevard that would exceed the aesthetic value of all other streets in Kansas City, Nichols hired landscape architect George Kessler, who had designed several other boulevards throughout Kansas City, Missouri.

The street was named after a prominent Kansas City attorney Hugh Campbell Ward (1864-1909), who was a business partner of J.C. Nichols and donated his family property to the city. He died before the papers were signed, but his wife, Vassie James Ward, followed his will.

As Nichols platted the district, beginning in 1906, he reserved space for Ward Parkway. The largest lots in the district were reserved for houses to be built along the boulevard. The Kansas City Parks Department added Ward Parkway into its formal boulevard system. Nichols traveled to Italy and England to buy statues and monuments to place in the boulevard's wide median. He also placed ponds and decorative urns throughout the parkway's length. To promote his development, Nichols periodically placed photographs of the large houses being built along Ward Parkway in Sunday editions of the Kansas City Star. Nichols even moved into a house just off Ward Parkway, on West 55th Street.

Some of the most prominent Kansas City families chose to build their homes on Ward Parkway (notable examples include Tom Pendergast House, Bernard Corrigan House, 
and Mack B. Nelson House).

By the time Evan S. Connell wrote Mrs. Bridge in 1959, the proximity of a prominent Kansas Citian's house to Ward Parkway was seen as an indication of that person's place in Kansas City society. Around that time, a sociological research study undertaken by the University of Chicago determined that Ward Parkway and its vicinity was the most desirable neighborhood in all of Kansas City.

In 2012, Ward Parkway was named a Great Street in the American Planning Association's annual list of Great Places in America, citing that the passion “by both citizens and city government to maintain the parkway has allowed it to remain one of the area's most coveted addresses with historic homes, neighborhood parks, picturesque fountains, ornamental monuments, and rolling landscapes.”

Improvement and Preservation
The Ward Parkway Center Community Improvement District, the area within West 85th Terrace, Ward Parkway, West 89th Street and State Line Road, was created in 2011 to allow the city to levy a one percent sales tax to help fund parkway projects and redevelop the area. One project that benefited from the District is the Ward Parkway Center, a large indoor shopping center near the southern end of the parkway. In addition, the city also allocated more than $9 million for the maintenance and improvements of park grounds, fountain and monuments, and recreational facilities along parkways.

Several sites and buildings along Ward Parkway are designated as National Historic Sites and are listed on the National Register of Historic Places. These include the Park Manor Historic District at 910-920 Ward Parkway; the Serena Apartment Hotel, a nine-story Italian Renaissance Revival Villa, and the Alexander Majors Antebellum house at West 83rd. In 1996, design guidelines for building along the parkway were adopted, and new construction on the parkway requires a certificate from the Historic Preservation Committee.

Notable residents of houses along Ward Parkway

 Tom Pendergast, political boss
 Keith A. Tucker, former CEO of Waddell & Reed mutual fund company
 Peter Brown, CEO and Co-founder of AMC Theatres.
 Jason Kander, politician. 
 Richard Bloch, co-founder of H&R Block

See also
 Country Club District
 Mission Hills, Kansas
 Ward Parkway Center
 List of neighborhoods in Kansas City, Missouri

References

External links
Ward Parkway - a Grand American Avenue
American Planning Association's Great Places in America - 2012

Transportation in Kansas City, Missouri
Streets in Kansas City, Missouri
Populated places established in 1906
U.S. Route 56
Roads on the National Register of Historic Places in Missouri
Parks on the National Register of Historic Places in Missouri
National Register of Historic Places in Kansas City, Missouri
Transportation in Jackson County, Missouri
1906 establishments in Missouri